Milan Smrčka, more known as Záviš (born 27 September 1956 in Znojmo), is a Czech singer, guitarist and poet. His work is most often classified as pornofolk. Záviš is admired even by Karel Gott.

Works
 Určeno pro uši rabijáků (1998)
 Slunce v duši (2000)
 Záviš, syn vojáka (2001)
 Sejdeme se na věčnosti (2002)
 Radost pohledět (2004)
 Život je sranda (2005)
 Když prší (2006)
 Rolník a rorýsek (2007)
 Bože, já jsem vůl (2008)
 Závišova devátá (2009)
 "Záva & Pepa - Naživo za pivo" (2010)
Nevytahuj mi ho prosím na veřejnosti (2012, vlastní náklad)
K tomu nic (2014, Ears&Wind Records)
Závišova dvanáctka (2016, Ears&Wind Records)U prdele (2018, Ears&Wind Records)Hrci-prci (2020, Ears&Wind Records)Výlet do Znojma (2022)Literary
 Oběšený Petr (1998)
 Konec zhuntovaného kavalíra (2001)
 Záviš, pacient Šafáře (2003)
 Ať žije republika (2005)
 Nedá se svítit'' (2007)
 "Prvé písně Závišovy" (2008)
 "Pičoviny" (2010)

References

Further reading
 Král drsných balad 

1956 births
People from Znojmo
Living people
Czech folk singers
Czech guitarists
Male guitarists
Czech male poets
21st-century Czech male singers